The Midland Building is a  tall skyscraper located at 250 East Broad Street, Columbus, Ohio. The office building was completed in 1970 and has 21 floors. Thomas E. Stanley designed the building, which is the 19th tallest in Columbus.

See also
List of tallest buildings in Columbus

References

Skyscraper office buildings in Columbus, Ohio
Buildings in downtown Columbus, Ohio
Office buildings completed in 1970
Broad Street (Columbus, Ohio)